USS LST-1044 was an LST-542-class tank landing ship in the United States Navy. Like many of her class, she was not named and is properly referred to by her hull designation.

History
LST-1044 was laid down on 25 November 1944 at Pittsburgh, Pa., by the Dravo Corporation; launched on 3 February 1945; sponsored by Mrs. J. D. Port; and commissioned on 2 March 1945.

Following World War II, LST-1044 performed occupation duty in the Far East and saw service in China until mid-April 1946. She returned to the United States and was decommissioned on 28 June 1946 and struck from the Navy list on 31 July that same year. On January 1948, the ship was sold to Pablo N. Ferrari & Co. for operation, and was transferred to Argentina.

Argentine service 
In Argentine Navy service, LST-1044 was renamed ARA Cabo Pio and redesignated BDT-10 (Buque Desembarco de Tanques), later Q-50.  She was retired in 1981.

References

Notes

Bibliography

External links 
  history.navy.mil: USS LST-1044
  navsource.org: USS LST-1044

 

LST-542-class tank landing ships
World War II amphibious warfare vessels of the United States
Ships built in Pittsburgh
1944 ships
LST-542-class tank landing ships of the Argentine Navy
Ships built by Dravo Corporation